Sergey Vasilyevich Malyutin (4 October 1859 – 6 December 1937) was a Russian painter of fine crafts, (scenic) designer, illustrator and architect; initially associated with the Arts and Crafts Movement. Most of his oil paintings are portraits. Outside of Russia, he is perhaps best known for designing the first set of Matryoshka dolls, created by Vasily Zvyozdochkin in 1890.

Biography 
Malyutin was born in Moscow to a family of merchants in 1859 and was raised in Voronezh where, in 1870, an exhibition by the Peredvizhniki inspired him to become an artist. From 1883 to 1886, he attended the Moscow School of Painting, Sculpture and Architecture (MSPSA), where he studied with Illarion Pryanishnikov and Vladimir Makovsky. Upon graduating, he was awarded a silver medal. In 1890, he was named a "Free Artist".

That same year, he was employed as a designer by the Private Opera of Savva Mamontov and, over the following decade and a half, would create sets for numerous operas and ballets, including the Nutcracker at the Mariinsky Theater.

During this time, he also created illustrations for the works of Pushkin and some Russian folk tales.

In 1900, he went to the art colony in Talashkino, near Smolensk, where he was involved in the ceramic and carving workshops of Princess Maria Tenisheva and joined the movement known as "Mir Iskusstva". While there, he designed a building for the school library (named "", after a Russian folktale) and decorated the theater. He remained there until 1903. His designs for a church were later realized by the architect Vladimir Suslov. His architectural designs were basically part of the Russian Revival movement, but were also embellished with fantastic folk motifs.

From 1903 to 1917, he taught at the MSPSA. During that time, he joined the Peredvizhniki (1913) and was named an "Academician" by the Imperial Academy of Arts (1914). After the 1917 Revolution, he worked as an instructor at the "Higher Artistic and Technical Workshops" known as Vkhutemas ("ВХУТЕМАС"); a school established by Vladimir Lenin. He was there until 1923. From 1918 to 1921, he also participated in the creation of the propaganda posters known as "Rosta Windows". In 1922, he was one of the co-founders of the Association of Artists of Revolutionary Russia, which held its first meeting at his home, and became an advocate for Socialist Realism.

He died in Moscow in 1937 at the age of 79.

Selected works

References

Further reading 

 Alina Abramova, Жизнь художника Сергея Малютина, Изобраз. искусство, 1978
 Galina Vladimirovna Golinets, Сергей Васильевич Малютин, "Selected Works of Soviet Artists" series, Советский художник, 1987

External links 

 Arcadja Auctions: More works by Malyutin.

1859 births
1937 deaths
19th-century painters from the Russian Empire
Russian male painters
20th-century Russian painters
Russian architects
Russian illustrators
Russian scenic designers
Socialist realist artists
Arts and Crafts movement artists
Artists from Moscow
Russian portrait painters
19th-century male artists from the Russian Empire
20th-century Russian male artists
Moscow School of Painting, Sculpture and Architecture alumni